The Sacrifice is the 52nd book in the Animorphs series, written by K. A. Applegate. It is known to have been ghostwritten by Kim Morris. It is the final book to be (fully) narrated by Ax.

Plot summary
During a reconnaissance flight taken by Rachel, Ax, and James, the Animorphs learn that the Yeerks are herding people into the subway system. The subways have been redirected to the Yeerk pool complex, where humans are being infested en masse.

Back at the Hork-Bajir valley, Rachel makes her report to Jake. Marco comes up with a plan to use the subway system to destroy the Yeerk pool by loading one of the pool-bound trains with explosives and detonating once the train reaches its destination. Despite some resistance from Cassie, the Animorphs agree to carry out the plan.

Later that night, Ax sneaks away from the camp with the zero-space transmitter constructed by Marco's father. Ax contacts the Andalite military and tells them of the Animorphs' plan to destroy the Yeerk pool. The Andalites do not support the plan and feel that the war for Earth is lost. Ax is ordered to sabotage the Animorphs' operation to destroy the Yeerk pool so that the Yeerks will continue concentrating the majority of their forces on Earth, allowing the Andalites to wipe them out more easily.

The next morning, the Animorphs finalize their plan to destroy the Yeerk pool. During the meeting, Cassie announces that she and her parents will not be going on the mission, since they cannot face risking so many Controllers' lives.  She gets into an argument with Rachel over it, and then another with Jake. With Rachel, Cassie is accused of essentially giving up in the fight against the Yeerks, which makes Cassie admonish Rachel for how horrible her attitude has become, even to the point where even Rachel's own mother cannot stand to be in her presence. With Jake, who initially tries to defuse Cassie and Rachel's dispute, Cassie derides him for being so willing to risk human lives, adding that she had previously thought that she had known him better than that. However, Jake fires back that Cassie had acted as though she had thought that she had known what was best for him and everybody on the team, subtly referring to her actions with Tom two books prior. As a result, the stress of the arguments causes Cassie to break down and confess that it was she who allowed Tom to escape with the morphing cube. Despite the shock and anger at this realization (as well as Rachel attempting to punch Cassie before being stopped by Tobias, who is in his human morph at this time), the other Animorphs forgive Cassie for her actions and continue planning the operation, with the exception of Ax, who feels a cold hatred towards Cassie for letting Tom take the cube.

After the meeting, Ax pulls Cassie aside and asks her to justify her actions. He reminds her that regardless of her reasons, she betrayed the memory of his brother, Elfangor, by giving up the one thing he'd given the Animorphs to give them a fighting chance against the Yeerks. Cassie feels incredible guilt when she realizes this, also realizing that she has hurt Ax in the process, but still remains firm in her convictions.  She recalls Aftran 942 and the Yeerk Peace Movement, and speculates that the morphing technology could give the Yeerks a means to abandon their policy of infesting sentient beings and instead morph new bodies. Ax concedes that he encountered a Yeerk who planned to do this on the subway mission, though he also speculates that the Yeerk could have been lying. After speaking with Cassie, Ax talks with Tobias, who voices his support of Cassie's reasoning, even if he did not necessarily agree with her actual actions. As a result of their talk, Ax decides to disobey the orders he was given and not sabotage the plan to destroy the Yeerk pool.

The next night, Ax leads the other Animorphs' parents through the woods towards a National Guard base, where the Animorphs hope to steal the explosives they need for their operation. Upon reaching the base's perimeter, the parents pose as lost campers in need of medical attention. The National Guardsmen load them into a truck and drive towards the base, with Marco clinging to the back of the truck in gorilla-morph. The other Animorphs follow as either fleas on Marco or in various bird-of-prey-morphs.

Upon reaching the National Guard base, the Animorphs begin searching the various warehouses for the explosives. Once they are found, they begin loading the explosives onto the trucks commandeered by Rachel's mother, Naomi, and Cassie's father, Walter. On their way out, the Guardsmen, alerted by an alarm, halt the trucks. Rachel initially tries to run them down, but is stopped by Ax. Jake and Naomi speak with the Guardsmen's commander, Captain Olston, and explain the situation. The Guardsmen agree to assist the Animorphs in their operation.

The Animorphs' parents all return to the Hork-Bajir valley, while several National Guard troops drive the trucks into the city, where the Animorphs themselves, along with the troops, disable the Yeerk forces guarding the subway station. The Animorphs are forced to fight with several morph-capable Controllers, with several using wolf-morphs (the same battle morph as Cassie). The Guardsmen kill several of the wolves, making Ax fear that Cassie has been killed in a friendly fire incident. Fortunately, Cassie survives the battle and Ax silently reconciles with her. Marco, Ax, and Cassie volunteer to accompany the train to the Yeerk pool, now loaded with explosives.

Ax keys the detonator so that the explosives will go off five minutes after reaching the Yeerk pool, giving the Controllers and hosts there time to escape. The subway train jackknifes into the Yeerk pool. Ax, Cassie, and Marco survive due to being in various insect-morphs during the collision. They demorph and warn those in the pool of the situation, and then begin freeing caged-hosts. Visser One briefly emerges to do battle, but leaves after Marco tells him of the impending explosion. Ax, Cassie, and Marco leave the doomed Yeerk pool complex just as the bombs detonate.

The Animorphs survey the devastation. The destruction of the Yeerk pool destroys a large area of the Animorphs' hometown. Jake privately thanks Ax for his participation, and Ax silently pledges his continued support to his prince.

Contributions to the series' story arc
The Yeerks abandon their infiltration strategy for conquering Earth.
Rachel, Tobias, Marco, and Ax all learn that Cassie was the one responsible for giving up the Escafil device to the Yeerks.
The Yeerk Pool is destroyed.

Morphs

2001 novels
2001 science fiction novels
Animorphs books